Rauno Alliku (born 2 March 1990) is an Estonian professional footballer who plays as a forward for Estonian Meistriliiga club Flora.

Club career

Flora
On 31 July 2008, Alliku signed for Flora and was immediately sent on loan to Vaprus, where he played until June 2009. He was then loaned to Flora affiliated Meistriliiga club Tulevik. Alliku won his first Meistriliiga title with Flora in the 2010 season. He won his second league title in the 2011 season, and a third one in the 2015 season.

International career
Alliku started his international youth career in 2008. In December 2010, he was named by the Estonia national football team manager Tarmo Rüütli in the Estonia squad to face China and Qatar. He made his debut on 18 December 2010, starting against China.

Honours

Club
Flora
Meistriliiga: 2010, 2011, 2015, 2017, 2019, 2020
Estonian Cup: 2010–11, 2012–13, 2015–16, 2019–20
Estonian Supercup: 2011, 2012, 2014, 2016, 2020

References

External links

1990 births
Living people
Estonian footballers
Estonia youth international footballers
Estonia under-21 international footballers
Estonia international footballers
Pärnu JK Vaprus players
Viljandi JK Tulevik players
FC Flora players
Meistriliiga players
Esiliiga players
Association football forwards
Sportspeople from Pärnu